April Weaver (born April 13, 1971) is an American politician and nurse serving as a member of the Alabama Senate from the 14th district. She previously served in the Alabama House of Representatives for the 49th district from 2010 to 2020.

Education 
Weaver earned a certificate in nursing from Kaplan University, an associate degree in nursing from Shelton State Community College, a Bachelor of Science degree in business administration from University of Alabama, a Master of Business Administration from Independence University, and an executive certificate in energy policy planning from the University of Idaho.

Career 
She resigned on May 12, 2020, to accept the position of regional director for Region IV (Alabama, Florida, Georgia, Kentucky, Mississippi, North Carolina, South Carolina, and Tennessee) of the United States Department of Health and Human Services in the Trump administration.

Weaver announced she would run in the special election to replace Cam Ward in the Alabama Senate, who announced he was resigning to become director of the Alabama Board of Pardons and Paroles. She won the Republican Primary with 82% of the vote and defeated Virginia Teague Applebaum in the general election. She assumed office on July 14, 2021.

References

1971 births
Living people
Republican Party members of the Alabama House of Representatives
Women state legislators in Alabama
United States Department of Health and Human Services officials
Shelton State Community College alumni
21st-century American women